Deliverance: Stormlord II (also known as Deliverance: Stormlord 2) is a 1990 platform game developed and published by Hewson Consultants in 1990 for the Amstrad CPC, Commodore 64 and ZX Spectrum as a sequel to the 1989 game Stormlord. Its remake for the Amiga, Atari ST, and Macintosh, titled Deliverance, followed in 1992.

Gameplay

Similar to the first Stormlord game, there are fairies to free and monsters to mash all the while avoiding the platform traps. However, the game becomes more of an action sideways game. The game is divided into three levels divided into two sections each, with bosses and bonus levels in the end of each. All of the original's action-adventure gameplay elements are absent in the sequel.

Plot
The game begins after the warrior Stormlord's victory over the demonic invasion in the first game. The evil Black Queen is gone, but her surviving followers combine their powers and capture all the fairies again. Now, Stormlord has to rescue the fairies for the second time, fighting his way through six levels from the depths of Hell all the way to Heaven.

Reception
The game was well received. Its original ZX Spectrum version was awarded the review scores of 80% and 85% from Crash, 8/10 from Sinclair User, and 91% from Your Sinclair.

Remake

References

External links
 Deliverance: Stormlord II at MobyGames
 

1990 video games
Amstrad CPC games
Commodore 64 games
Fantasy video games
Single-player video games
Video game sequels
Video games developed in the United Kingdom
Video games about witchcraft
ZX Spectrum games
Hewson Consultants games